The 1970 World Wrestling Championships were held in Edmonton, Alberta, Canada.

Medal table

Team ranking

Medal summary

Men's freestyle

Men's Greco-Roman

References
FILA Database
Page 30

World Wrestling Championships
International wrestling competitions hosted by Canada
World Wrestling Championships, 1970
1970 in Canadian sports
July 1970 sports events in Canada